Albin "Spjass" Hallbäck (6 April 1902 – 18 December 1962) was a Swedish footballer who played as a forward.

Club career 
Hallbäck represented Malmö BI and IFK Malmö during his club career. He played a total of 152 games in all competitions for IFK Malmö, scoring 93 goals.

International career 
Hallbäck made his debut for the Sweden national team on 26 June 1926, scoring two goals in a 3–3 draw with Germany. On 29 May 1927, he scored six goals in a 12–0 win against Latvia, which is a Sweden national team record. He won his last international cap on 19 June 1927, in a 0–0 draw with Denmark. He won a total of four caps, scoring ten goals.

Career statistics

International 

Scores and results list Sweden's goal tally first, score column indicates score after each Hallbäck goal.

Honours 
Records

 Most goals for the Sweden national team in a single game: 6 (against Latvia on 20 May 1927)

References 

Sweden international footballers
IFK Malmö Fotboll players
Swedish footballers
Association football forwards
1902 births
1962 deaths